Bhadua  is a village in Chanditala I community development block of Srirampore subdivision in Hooghly district in the Indian state of West Bengal.

Geography

Gram panchayat
Villages and census towns in Bhagabatipur gram panchayat are: Bhadua, Bhagabatipur, Jalamadul, Kanaidanga, Metekhal and Singjor.

Demographics
As per 2011 Census of India, Bhadua had a total population of 4,704 of which 2,334 (50%) were males and 2,370 (50%) were females. Population below 6 years was 612. The total number of literates in Bhadua was 2,971 (72.61% of the population over 6 years).

References 

Villages in Chanditala I CD Block